The Thailand ten-satang coin is a currency unit equivalent to one-tenth of a Thai baht. It is rare in circulation but used in banking transactions.

Mintages 
 1987 ~ 5,000
 1988 ~ 895,000
 1989 ~ 80,000
 1990 ~ 100,050
 1991 ~ 25,000
 1992 ~ 61,000
 1993 ~ 100,000
 1994 ~ 500,000
 1995 ~ 500,000
 1996 - 0
 1997 ~ 10,000
 1998 ~ 10,000
 1999 ~ 20,000
 2000 ~ 10,000
 2001 ~ 50,000
 2002 - 0
 2003 ~ 10,000
 2004 ~ 10,000
 2005 ~ 20,000
 2006 ~ 3,000
 2007 ~ 10,000
 2008 ~ 10,000
 2009 ~ 10,000

1908–1939 coin
A historical version of the coin was introduced in 1908 as a coin with a hole through its middle and minted until 1939.

References 

Coins of Thailand
Ten-cent coins